The Piscataqua River border dispute was a dispute between the US states of Maine and New Hampshire over ownership of Seavey’s Island in the Piscataqua River, which forms the border between Maine and New Hampshire. The dispute was settled in 2002 by the US Supreme Court in favor of Maine.

Background
Seavey’s Island lies in the northern side of the Piscataqua River, between the town of Kittery, Maine, and the city of Portsmouth, New Hampshire. The island was originally five separate islands which were conjoined between 1800 and 1866 in order to build a naval shipyard. The State of Maine asserts that the boundary between the states runs along the middle of the river to the south of Seavey’s Island, which places the island within Maine. The State of New Hampshire asserts a historical claim to ownership of the river up to the shoreline on the Maine side, which would place the island within New Hampshire.

The United States government owns the island, which is the site of the Portsmouth Naval Shipyard. For many years the US Navy regarded the shipyard as belonging to New Hampshire (whence the name Portsmouth Naval Shipyard after the city of Portsmouth, New Hampshire). Later the Navy adopted a neutral position in the dispute.

Maine imposes an income tax on workers at the shipyard, even those who live in New Hampshire. Moreover, aspects of the income tax are based on household income and result in larger payments due to the earnings of spouses who neither live nor work in Maine.

Supreme Court case
In March 2000 New Hampshire filed a lawsuit in the Supreme Court against Maine, claiming ownership of the island. According to the US Constitution, the Supreme Court has original jurisdiction in cases “in which a State shall be a Party”.

In 1977, New Hampshire had sued Maine (see New Hampshire v. Maine) over lobster fishing rights in the littoral waters off the Piscataqua River. In that case the Supreme Court entered a consent decree between the states, in which they agreed that the “middle of the river” was defined as the thalweg -- “the middle of the main channel of navigation of the Piscataqua River.” The settlement was based on a 1740 decree by King George II, defining the border between the states as the middle of the main navigation channel. The 1977 case, however, was concerned only with the “lateral marine boundary” (littoral waters) between the mouth of the river and the Isles of Shoals, and did not strictly address the inland boundaries between the states.

Maine responded to the 2001 suit with a request to dismiss based on the principle of res judicata, arguing that the 1740 decision and the outcome of the 1977 case barred New Hampshire from filing another border complaint.  Indeed, the case was dismissed on procedural grounds, not decided on the arguments.

On May 29, 2001, Justice Ruth Bader Ginsburg delivered the 8–0 decision of the Court. (Justice Souter recused himself from the decision; although justices often do not disclose their reasons for recusal, it is most likely because he had been the Attorney General of New Hampshire and later an associate justice of the New Hampshire Supreme Court in the 1970s and 1980s.) Justice Ginsburg wrote that "judicial estoppel bars New Hampshire from asserting that the Piscataqua River boundary runs along the Maine shore." Under the judicial estoppel doctrine, “Where a party assumes a certain position in a legal proceeding, and succeeds in maintaining that position, he may not thereafter, simply because his interests have changed, assume a contrary position, especially if it be to the prejudice of the party who has acquiesced in the position formerly taken by him...” Put simply: Since New Hampshire had agreed in 1977 that the border runs along the middle of the river, New Hampshire may not now claim that the border runs along the Maine riverbank. Wrote Justice Ginsburg: “New Hampshire’s claim that the Piscataqua River boundary runs along the Maine shore is clearly inconsistent with its interpretation of the words ‘Middle of the River’ during the 1970s litigation.”

New Hampshire appealed the dismissal and requested the Court to reconsider its dismissal, but the Court denied the motion to reconsider.

See also
 New Hampshire Revised Statutes Annotated regarding New Hampshire’s borders with Maine and other states

References

External links
 Justia.com: The consent decree in New Hampshire v. Maine (1977)

2001 in American law
2002 in American law
2002 in Maine
2002 in New Hampshire
Geography of Maine
Geography of New Hampshire
Internal territorial disputes of the United States